The East Asian Institute (EAI) is an autonomous research institute and think tank of the National University of Singapore (NUS), that focuses on the political, social and economic development in East and Southeast Asia. 

As of 2022, the institute's chairman and director are Teh Kok Peng and Bert Hofman respectively.

History 
The institute was founded in April 1997. It succeeded the former Institute of East Asian Political Economy (IEAPE). The IEAPE was itself the successor of the Institute of East Asian Philosophies, founded in 1983 for the study of Confucianism by Goh Keng Swee, the then-Minister for Education and Deputy Prime Minister of Singapore.

The Institute of East Asian Philosophies (IEAP) was formed after a panel of scholars was asked by the Government to make recommendations on the teaching of Confucian ethics to secondary school students. It received a donation of $3 million from a Hong Kong industrialist, John Tung, who also joined the institute's board. Several prominent scholars based in other countries, such as Tu Wei-ming and Yu Ying Shih, served as board members of the institute and consultants on the development of the teaching curriculum. The scholar and academic Wu Teh Yao was a director of the IEAP.

References

External links 
 Homepage of the East Asian Institute

Economy of East Asia
Economy of Southeast Asia
National University of Singapore
Politics of East Asia
Politics of Southeast Asia
Research institutes in Singapore